The Alytus District Municipality is a municipality in Alytus County, Lithuania, located in the Dzūkija ethnographic region.

This municipality was founded in 1950, and until 1953 was a part of the Kaunas Province. In 1959, another reorganization of parts of the former Simnas and Daugai municipalities occurred, which included the towns of Simnas and Daugai. In 1962 it was expanded more, attaching part of the former Jieznas municipality. In 1968 parts of the municipality were attached to the Prienai District Municipality and Trakai District Municipality, and 1969 another part of Varėna District Municipality.

The current Coat of Arms of the Alytus district municipality was announced by Lithuanian presidential decree on August 7, 2001.

Heritage 
Alytus District Municipality has 72 archeological, 395 historical, 144 art, 29 architectural and 3 urbanistic monuments, as well as 19 hillforts.

Geography 
The district has 23.5% of its territory covered in forests, mostly pinewoods. The largest forests are Punia Pinewood and Noškūnai Forest. Peatland makes up 9% of the district. The district is also home to the Žuvintas Biosphere Reserve. Neman flows northwards through the district, as well as its tributaries Bambena, Peršėkė and Varėnė. The district has 70 lakes.

Elderships 
The Alytus district municipality contains 11 elderships:

Structure 
District structure:   
 2 cities – Daugai and Simnas;
 3 towns – Butrimonys, Krokialaukis, Nemunaitis;
 426 villages.

Biggest population (2001):  
Simnas – 1980
Daugai – 1458
Butrimonys – 1126
Miklusėnai – 1021
Punia – 809
Luksnėnai – 614
Venciūnai – 588
Alovė – 552
Daugai (village) – 480
Ūdrija – 453

Partnership regions 
Cities and regions that have partnerships with Alytus District:

  Gmina Puńsk, Poland
  Ostrołęka County, Poland
  Choszczno, Poland
  Pisz, Poland
  Sopot, Poland
  Västra Götaland County, Sweden

Population by locality

Status: M, MST - city, town / K, GST - village / VS - steading

References

 
Municipalities of Alytus County
Municipalities of Lithuania